The Schütte-Lanz D.II was a variant of the Schütte-Lanz D.I. The only change was a new engine - the 100 hp Mercedes D.I 6-cylinder water-cooled engine replacing the 80 hp Oberursel U.0 rotary engine in the D.I.  The aircraft was never flown.

Specifications

Bibliography 
 William Green and  Gordon Swanborough. The Complete Book of Fighters.  Colour Library Direct, Godalming, UK: 1994.

Further reading

 

1910s German fighter aircraft
D.II
Biplanes
Aircraft first flown in 1915